Winter Reckoning is the first science fantasy novel by Noel-Anne Brennan.  It was first published in 1986 by Donald M. Grant, Publisher, Inc. in an edition of 650 copies which were signed by the author.

Plot introduction
The novel concerns the adventures of Molly Kerbridge, a member of the Planetary Federation, on a world called Tringe.  There she encounters the Fnick, a reptilian race intent on conquest.

References

1986 American novels
American fantasy novels
American science fiction novels
Donald M. Grant, Publisher books